There are two species of gecko  named big-scaled dwarf gecko:
 Sphaerodactylus macrolepis, distributed in Puerto Rico, the United States Virgin Islands, and the British Virgin Islands in the Caribbean
 Sphaerodactylus grandisquamis, endemic to Puerto Rico